"Dove (I'll Be Loving You)" is the debut solo single by Italian musician Moony, released on 27 May 2002 from her debut album, Lifestories. It achieved success in several European and Oceanian countries, becoming a top-20 hit in Denmark, Hungary, Italy, Romania, Spain, and the United Kingdom. To date, "Dove" remains Moony's biggest solo hit. The music video was shot in Spain by Canadian director Stuart Gosling.

Critical reception
Miriam Hubner of Music & Media magazine praised the song, complimenting Moony's "fresh" vocals and "cutting-edge" production. In Birmingham, 96.4 FM BRMB programme controller Adam Bridge said of the song, "I think it's a fresh, bright and funky piece of poppy dance music".

Track listings
Italian 12-inch single
A. "Dove (I'll Be Loving You)" (T&F vs Moltosugo club mix) – 6:38
B. "Dove (I'll Be Loving You)" (Full Intention vocal mix) – 8:27

Maxi-CD 1
 "Dove (I'll Be Loving You)" (T&F vs Moltosugo radio mix) – 4:02
 "Dove (I'll Be Loving You)" (Full Intention vocal mix) – 8:28
 "Dove (I'll Be Loving You)" (John Creamer & Stephane K remix) – 6:54

Maxi-CD 2
 "Dove (I'll Be Loving You)" (T&F vs Moltosugo radio mix) – 4:04
 "Dove (I'll Be Loving You)" (T&F vs Moltosugo club mix) – 6:33
 "Dove (I'll Be Loving You)" (The Phil Fuldner treatment) – 8:11
 "Dove (I'll Be Loving You)" (Full Intention Vocal mix) – 8:37
 "Dove (I'll Be Loving You)" (Andrea T. Mendoza club remix) – 7:54

Australian maxi-CD
 "Dove (I'll Be Loving You)" (T&F vs Moltosugo radio mix) – 4:02
 "Dove (I'll Be Loving You)" (T&F vs Moltosugo club mix) – 6:35
 "Dove (I'll Be Loving You)" (Full Intention vocal mix) – 8:30
 "Dove (I'll Be Loving You)" (John Creamer & Stephane K vocal mix) – 9:54
 "Dove (I'll Be Loving You)" (The Phil Fuldner Treatment) – 8:13

Credits
 Written by Monica Bragato, Mauro Ferrucci, Francesco Giacomello, Tommy Vianello
 Recorded and mixed by Roy Malone
 Edited by Tommy Vee
 Piano by Sisco
 Bass by Ingo Peter Schwartz
 Drum programming by J. Kelle
 Produced by Frankie Tamburo and Mauro Ferrucci

Charts

Weekly charts

Year-end charts

Release history

References

2002 songs
2002 debut singles
Italian dance-pop songs
Electrola singles
EMI Records singles
Moony songs
Music videos directed by Stuart Gosling
Positiva Records singles